Pazarcık is a town and district in the southern part of Kahramanmaraş Province in Turkey. The mayor Hayrettin Güngör from the Justice and Development Party (AKP) was elected in the local elections 2019. Kaymakam is Adil Nas. The cement plant is a major source of greenhouse gas. The town includes Abdals of the Kara Hüseyinler tribe.

On 6 February 2023, a magnitude 7.8 earthquake struck Pazarcik.

Notable natives 
 Ferruh Bozbeyli (1927–2019), Turkish politician.
 Hasan Yükselir (1955–), Turkish singer and composer.
 Dilber Ay (1956–2019), Turkish singer.
 KC Rebell (1988–), German rapper of Kurdish origin.

References

External links

  District governor's official website
  District municipality's official website

Populated places in Kahramanmaraş Province
Districts of Kahramanmaraş Province
Towns in Turkey